The 2012 UEFA Women's U-19 Championship Second qualifying round will determine the participating teams at the 2012 UEFA Women's U-19 Championship held in Turkey.

Qualified teams
Seeded nations Germany, France and England were joined by 21 teams from the first qualifying round. Northern Ireland qualified as the best third placed team.

Group stage
The draw was held on 15 November 2011 at Nyon, Switzerland. Teams will be drawn in six groups of four. The winners and best runners-up will qualify for the final tournament.

All times CET

Group 1

Group 2

Group 3

Group 4

Group 5

Group 6

Ranking of second-placed teams
In the ranking of the second-place finishers, only the results against the first and third placed teams count.

References

External links
UEFA.com; official website

2
2012 second
2012 in women's association football
2012 in youth sport